Golubović, Голубовић is a Serbian surname. Notable people with the surname include:

 Danilo Golubović, Serbian politician
 Kristijan Golubović, Serbian criminal
 Srdan Golubović, Serbian film director 
 Petar Golubović, Serbian football player 

Serbian surnames